The Sixth principal meridian at 97°22′08″W extends from the baseline coincident with the north boundary of Kansas in latitude 40°N south through the state to its south boundary in latitude 37°N and north through Nebraska to the Missouri River and governs the surveys in Kansas and Nebraska; the surveys in Wyoming except those referred to the Wind River meridian and base line, which intersect in latitude 43°01′20″N and longitude 108°48′40″W from Greenwich; the surveys in Colorado except those projected from the New Mexico and Ute meridians the latter intersecting its baseline in latitude 39°06′40″N and longitude 108°33′20″W from Greenwich; and the surveys in South Dakota extended or to be extended over the tract embracing the Pine Ridge and Rosebud Indian Reservations.

See also
List of principal and guide meridians and base lines of the United States

Further reading

External links

6
Meridians (geography)